Gunvald Christian Berhard Thorkildsen (19 July 1845–1908) was a Norwegian theologian and Bishop in the Church of Norway.

Personal life
Thorkildsen was born on 19 July 1845 in Christianssand, Norway to parents Gunvald Christian Thorkildsen and Berte Thorkildsen.  He married Johanne Dich, the daughter of the parish priest Sigismund Christian Dich.

Career
Thorkildsen was a priest in the parish of Sund from 1872 until 1877.  In 1877, he became the parish priest in Øvrebø, based at Øvrebø Church, a job which he held until 1890.  In 1890, he was transferred to the neighboring parish of Oddernes, based at the large Oddernes Church.  He continued working in Oddernes until 1904 when he was appointed to be the Bishop of the Diocese of Kristiansand which (at that time) covered all of Rogaland, Agder, and Telemark in Southern Norway.  He was the bishop from 1904 until his death in 1908.

References

External links
Photograph of Bishop Thorkildsen's installation as Bishop

1845 births
1908 deaths
Bishops of Agder og Telemark
20th-century Lutheran bishops